The following television stations broadcast on digital channel 29 in Mexico:

 XEPM-TDT in Ciudad Juárez, Chihuahua 
 XEZ-TDT in Querétaro, Querétaro de Arteaga 
 XHBN-TDT in Oaxaca, Oaxaca 
 XHCDT-TDT in Ciudad Victoria, Tamaulipas 
 XHCQR-TDT in Chetumal, Quintana Roo 
 XHCTCH-TDT in Chihuahua, Chihuahua
 XHCTMX-TDT in Mexico City
 XHCTTH-TDT in Tapachula, Chiapas
 XHG-TDT in Guadalajara, Jalisco 
 XHGE-TDT in Campeche, Campeche 
 XHGUY-TDT in Guaymas, Sonora 
 XHHDL-TDT in Huajuapan de León, Oaxaca 
 XHHMS-TDT in Hermosillo, Sonora
 XHLAM-TDT in Lázaro Cárdenas, Michoacán de Ocampo
 XHLAR-TDT in Nuevo Laredo, Tamaulipas
 XHLGA-TDT in Aguascalientes, Aguascalientes
 XHLMI-TDT in Los Mochis, Michoacán
 XHLPB-TDT in La Paz, Baja California Sur 
 XHMAC-TDT in Ciudad Madera, Chihuahua 
 XHMLC-TDT in Monclova, Coahuila de Zaragoza
 XHMOW-TDT in Morelia, Michoacán de Ocampo
 XHMTDU-TDT in Durango, Durango
 XHMTS-TDT in Matehuala, San Luis Potosí 
 XHNOH-TDT in Nueva Rosita, Coahuila de Zaragoza
 XHOPMS-TDT in Mazatlán, Sinaloa
 XHP-TDT in Puebla, Puebla 
 XHPEH-TDT in Escárcega, Campeche 
 XHPFC-TDT in Parras de la Fuente, Coahuila de Zaragoza
 XHRBA-TDT in Río Bravo, Tamaulipas
 XHSLV-TDT in San Luis Potosí, San Luis Potosí
 XHSPQ-TDT in Cancún, Quintana Roo
 XHTAT-TDT in Tamazunchale, San Luis Potosí
 XHTCO-TDT in Tecomán, Colima
 XHTIT-TDT in Tijuana, Baja California
 XHTMBR-TDT in Veracruz, Veracruz
 XHTUA-TDT in Tuxtla Gutierrez, Chiapas
 XHTUX-TDT in Iguala, Guerrero
 XHVHT-TDT in Villahermosa, Tabasco
 XHWT-TDT in Tampico, Tamaulipas 
 XHZMT-TDT in Zamora, Michoacán de Ocampo 
 XHZOT-TDT in Mecayapan, Veracruz de Ignacio de la Llave

29